Oujiang Town is a town and the county seat of Guidong County in Hunan, China. The town was formed through the amalgamation of Sandong Township, Huangdong Township and Chengguan Town in 2012; on November 27, 2015, Hankou Township and Zengkou Township were merged to the town.

References

Guidong
County seats in Hunan
Towns of Chenzhou